Cherno More is a Bulgarian professional association football club based in the city of Varna, which currently competes in Bulgaria's primary football competition, the First League. Founded on March 3, 1913, as an association football branch of the larger sports society SC Galata, the club has spent the majority of its existence playing in the top tier of Bulgarian football.

Cherno More is named after the Black Sea, and the football club is also known by its nickname The Sailors. Cherno More's home ground is the Stadion Ticha, which has a seating capacity of 8,250 spectators, with plans to move to a new all-seater stadium by 2020, although due to financial issues, the construction has been put on hold. Cherno More previously hosted their games at the Yuri Gagarin Stadium, sharing it with fellow Varna club, Spartak. As one of the relatively successful clubs in Bulgarian football outside the capital Sofia, the Sailors have won the Bulgarian championship on four occasions, as well as the Bulgarian Cup once in 2015.

The club has a long-standing rivalry with neighbouring Spartak Varna, with matches between the two being commonly referred to as The Derby of Varna.

History

Early years
On March 3, 1913, Galata Sports Association was established in the male first high school in Varna, with association football being one of its departments. Later in 1913, Karel Škorpil, one of the founding members of the sports society and a prominent Czech-Bulgarian archaeologist, who settled in Varna at that time, suggested the association to be renamed to Reka Ticha, in homage of the old name of the Kamchiya river. On May 24, 1914 Sportist Sports Club, which was formed by Stefan Tonchev and a group of boys in 1909, joined Reka Ticha. Many Cherno More supporters today consider the officially acknowledged founding year 1913 to be historically incorrect, believing that SC Sportist's year of establishment in 1909 should be acknowledged as the year of establishment of Cherno More. Several years later, the first international friendly in Bulgarian club football history was played in 1915 between Reka Ticha and the 21st Pomeranian Regiment of Prussia, which ended in a 4–4 draw.  In 1919, Reka Ticha began playing matches against different teams from the capital Sofia, which ended in a success with scores of 3-0 and 1–0  against Slavia Sofia on a home-away basis and a 4–1 win against Levski Sofia in Varna. The away match with Levski in Sofia however did not take place. The subsequent growth of Bulgarian football required knowledge of the rules, and as such, in 1919, the football department of SC Reka Ticha published the first Bulgarian football rulebook titled "Football - Rules and Admonitions". It was written by the sports functionary and Reka Ticha's member Stefan Tonchev. 

On January 21, 1919, SC Reka Ticha shortened its name to Sports Club Ticha, and the kit colours were chosen to be red and white. In the same year, the Bulgarian musician Nikola Nitsov wrote the official anthem of the club.

In 1921 Sports Club Granit left the collective membership with SK Ticha due to financial disputes, becoming SC Vladislav after Polish king Władysław of Varna. Their emblem was the four-leaf clover and the kit colours were green and white which are still today the official colours of successor Cherno More. SC Vladislav was to become the first team to win the Tsar's Cup in 1925 rendering them the first champions of the Kingdom of Bulgaria. The captain, Egon Terzetta is revered by the Cherno More fans as the scorer in the final match, winning the cup for the green-white team. Later, in 1945 they will rejoin SK Ticha in a merger and the club will be known as Ticha-Vladislav.

In 1925 SK Ticha won the București Cup, after two straight wins against Tricolor (to become later Unirea Tricolor) and Sportul Sudenesc both from Bucharest. This turned to be the first international football trophy won by a Bulgarian football club, making SK Ticha the most popular club in Varna at the time.

In 1935 and 1936 SK Ticha finished as runners-up in the knockout National competition. In 1938 the club became Bulgarian champions winning the first edition of the United National Football league. The members of the Championship winning team were:  Ivan Sarajdarov, Onik Haripyan, Garabed Garabedov, Georgi Gochev, Atanas Kovachev, Georgi Radev, Willy Petkov, Panayot Rozov, Milyu Parushev, Iliya Donchev and Dobry Bajtchev.

In total, 18 SK Ticha and SC Vladislav players were selected for the national team. Boyan Byanov of SK Ticha captained the National team in its first ever match against Austria in Vienna, played on 21 May 1924. The same year he also participated in the Olympic National team for the Paris games.

Communist era (1944-1989)
With the establishment of Communist rule in Bulgaria after WWII, significant changes took place affecting all leading clubs without exception. It was a time for mergers, splits, changing of names and in some cases closure of clubs. All this, to suit the new vision of the new communist ruled government. On 18 February 1945, SC Ticha and SC Vladislav merged with all their available assets and the new name of the club was Ticha-Vladislav. An important issue about the merger of these two teams, and the claims by Cherno More supporters who descend from them, is that it was not as a result of bankruptcy, insolvency, bad debts or any other foul play, but the result of a decision by a political party which had absolute and unchecked power, which simply decided that there were just too many clubs in the city of Varna and that their number should be reduced.

On 11 May 1947 SC Primoretz also joined the club, now to be known as TVP. SC Primoretz practised basketball, tennis, athletics and swimming and did not have a football team. Chairman of the club was the long time SC Vladislav sportsman Aleksi Aleksiev who now became the chairman of TVP.

In 1948–49, under the name Botev, the club took part in the highest level of the first post-war league to be known as Bulgarian A Football Group or "A" RFG. Botev Varna finished 6th in a group of 10 teams with centre forward Nedko Nedev ending up as a joint top scorer of the competition with 11 goals, as many as Dimitar Milanov had scored for CDNV Sofia . Some more reorganisation, in accordance with the Soviet principles, took place in the next season. The town of Varna was renamed Stalin in honour of the Soviet dictator and stayed that way until 1956. A departmental system was applied, placing most clubs under the umbrella of two major departments, The Ministry of Defence and The Ministry of Interior. Botev Stalin went under military command and was ordered to play in the Third division (group "V") to make place for the newly formed People's Army team (ONV, later CSKA) from Sofia which started in "A" RFG straight after being founded. Although relegated by decree, the team of Botev Stalin retained most of its players and under the leadership of trainer Ivan Mokanov  was promoted back to "A" RFG in 2 successive seasons, under the name VMS (which stands for Bulgarian Navy).

In 1953, VMS Stalin finished 3rd in the competition after the two leading Sofia clubs. The saddest season in the club's history is 1955. It started with 5 consecutive wins, all against Sofia teams. The hopes of title-dreaming supporters were dashed with only 1 point in the following 10 games. The team was relegated at the end of the season to be promoted back the next year under its previous name, Botev Varna.

In 1959, a small team from "B" RFG by the name of Cherno More, which resulted from the merger of two other Varna teams (Lokomotiv and Korabostroitel) one year earlier, joined Botev and from this year until now, the club will go by the name Cherno More. The club stayed in "A" RFG without interruption until 1976 but did not have any major achievements. Under the control of the Ministry of Defence over the years, a number of talented players left de club for the Central Army Club (CSKA) without Cherno More receiving adequate compensation. One of them, Bozhil Kolev, starred in the defence of the National team in the World Cup finals in BRD'74.

Cherno More had its moments of glory in a friendly against Ajax which ended in a 3–1 win on 8 June 1966, with goals from Zdravko Mitev (2) and Stefan Bogomilov. The 19 year old Johan Cruyff scored for Ajax. In August 1966 the team from Varna visited England and played three matches. The most memorable was the 1–0 win against Nottingham Forest on City Ground. Nottingham fielded a strong side with Peter Grummitt, Bob McKinlay, Alan Hinton, Henry Newton, Joe Baker, Terry Hennessey, Jeff Whitefoot in the starting 11. The match was decided with a long range shot from defender Dimitar Bosnov in the first half. Nottingham Forest was to end the 1966-67 season as runners-up in the Football League First Division. The other two matches ended in a 1–1 draw against Coventry City after Stefan Yanev had opened the score, and a 1–2 defeat to Sheffield Wednesday F.C. After 16 years in the top flight, Cherno More was relegated in 1976 and won promotion the following season.  A new generation of players was emerging. Defenders Todor Marev and Ivan Ivanov, midfielders Todor Atanasov and Ivan Andreev, forwards Rafi Rafiev and Nikola Spasov left many good memories in the late 70s and the 80s. In the 1981–82 season, the team finished 4th and therefore qualified for the Intertoto Cup. Cherno More won twice 2–0 at home against Standard Liège and the Danes from Hvidovre IF and drew 1–1 against Bayer 04 Leverkusen. Away, they drew 1–1 in Denmark and lost 1-3 and 0–3 in Liège and Leverkusen respectively. Later in the 80s, Cherno More was relegated twice and played 3 seasons in "B" RFG. The team reached the final of The Soviet Army Cup and were runners-up twice in 1985 and 1988.

The 90s struggle
The fall of socialism in Bulgaria in 1989 and the establishment of democracy brought new hardships for Bulgarian football clubs. The transition from state backed organisations to privately owned entities saw many traditional football clubs disappear entirely, while others were forced to declare bankruptcy, only to return later by obtaining licences from smaller clubs. Cherno More avoided any administrative changes and kept its name and history, but spent six consecutive seasons in the league's second tier. Relegated in season 1989-90 and again in 1993-94 and facing immense financial difficulties, at one time during the 1998–99 season, the club came close to relegation to the 3rd division of Bulgarian football. Despite being in the "B"RFG, Cherno More sold their best player and own product Ilian Iliev to Levski Sofia for a then Bulgarian record of 2 million leva (£60 000) in 1991. Things started to get better in 1998 with new chairman Krasen Kralev who turned the club into a joint-stock company.

New millennium

The new millennium saw the club establishing itself in the country's top flight. The Sailors spent the majority of the 90s in Bulgaria's second tier before securing promotion at the end of the 1999–2000 season, ending a six consecutive season spell in the B Group. Cherno More survived minor relegation scares in their first two seasons back in the A Group and then went on to become a regular feature in the league's top half. In 2002, Kralev convinced businessman Ilia Pavlov to buy the club. Pavlov had ideas about developing the club and turning it into one of the leaders in Bulgarian football. He appointed the young and ambitious coach Velislav Vutsov and signed many experienced players such as National team goalkeeper Zdravko Zdravkov, defenders Adalbert Zafirov and Georgi Ginchev. Some foreign players such as Lúcio Wagner, Darko Spalević and Maltese international Daniel Bogdanović also made their way to Varna. The results were quick to follow. Victories against champions CSKA in Sofia and Litex in Lovech saw the team soaring up in the table. The success story came to an abrupt end with the murder of Ilia Pavlov on 7 March 2003. Months of uncertainties followed and at some point, the very existence of the club was at stake until Bulgarian holding company Chimimport acquired the club in 2004.

In the 2007–08 season, the Sailors finished 5th in A Group and qualified for the last season of the UEFA Cup due to licence problems of CSKA Sofia. Led by captain Alex they had a very successful run - they defeated UE Sant Julia of Andora in the first qualifying round (9-0 on aggregate) and Maccabi Netanya from Israel in the second qualifying round (3-1 on aggregate). Cherno More than challenged German side VfB Stuttgart in the 1st round and were eliminated after a 1–2 loss at home and a surprising 2–2 draw in Stuttgart after having a 2–0 lead up until the 85th minute of the game. During the same season the team was successful finishing 3rd in A Group, and qualified for the newly created European football competition, the Europa League.

In the 2009–10 season, Cherno More started their UEFA Europa League campaign by defeating Iskra-Stal from Moldova in the second qualifying round (4-0 on aggregate). Subsequently, they were drawn to play against Dutch powerhouse PSV Eindhoven in the third qualifying round. The team from Varna was eliminated after a 0-1 loss at Eindhoven and another 0-1 loss at the Lazur Stadium in Burgas.

After finishing third in 2008–09, the club failed to impress in the domestic league in the follow-up years, but saw a successful run in the Bulgarian Cup during the 2014–15 season. The Sailors defeated Sozopol, Slavia Sofia, Lokomotiv Gorna Oryahovitsa, and Lokomotiv Plovdiv on the road to the final against Levski Sofia  at the Lazur Stadium in Burgas. Despite being down to ten men since the 39th minute and trailing 0–1, the team managed to equalize in added time through Bacari's volley and went on to win the Cup after Mathias Coureur's stunning strike in the 118th minute, winning the club's first post-World War II trophy.

Honours

Domestic
Bulgarian State Football Championship:

  Winners (4): 1925, 1926, 1934 (as Vladislav), 1937–38 (as Ticha)

Bulgarian Cup:
  Winners (1): 2015
  Runners-up (2): 2006, 2008

Bulgarian Supercup:
  Winners (1): 2015

Cup of the Soviet Army
  Runners-up (2): 1985, 1988

International
Bucharest Cup:
 Winners (1): 1925 (as Ticha Varna)

Chronology of the names

Recent seasons

League positions

*Points deducted from all teams after completing the first phase of campaign.

Championship/Relegation groups are constituted after all teams have played each other home and away.

European record

Matches

Notes
 1Q: First qualifying round
 2Q: Second qualifying round
 3Q: Third qualifying round
 PO: Play-off round

Stadium

Ticha Stadium is a multi-use stadium in Varna, Bulgaria. It is currently used for football matches and is the home ground of Cherno More. It is situated in the north-eastern part of Varna. Built in 1968, the stadium currently has a capacity of 8,250 seating places, spread in two opposite stands. The main south stand has a roof cover and holds 4,250 spectators, while the opposite north stand has a seating capacity of 4,000 spectators. The north stand is commonly used by the Cherno More ultras and the away fans. The current stadium was built entirely with the help of volunteers and sports fans of the club on the place of the old Reka Ticha playground.

In 2007, the local municipality governors and the owners of the club announced in an official statement, that the club would move to a new all-seater stadium, which would be built in the place of the previously unused and demolished Yuri Gagarin Stadium. It would also replace the current Ticha stadium, which would solve numerous problems on match day, including traffic congestion and the lack of nearby parking lots for the fans. The stadium will have a capacity of 22,000 spectators and would be part of Sport Complex Varna, which includes an underground parking area, convertible roof covers, office lounges, two-tier stands and four 50 meter towers, which would block the pressure of the terrain and bring the stadium's shape in a ship. The convertible roof covers will be made of transparent panels, which will allow the light of the floodlights to stream inside the pitch on a night match. The venue would be awarded with an Elite Stadium category ranking by UEFA.

Following several delays over the next years, majorly due to the global Financial crisis of 2007-2008 and the subsequent lack of funding, in 2015 the construction of the stadium finally started and is expected to be finished by late 2019, with the first match being played on the new stadium in 2020.

Statistics and records
Todor Marev holds A Group's and Cherno More's overall appearances record — 422 matches for 19 seasons (from 1971 to 1990).

Cherno More's all-time leading scorer is Stefan Bogomilov, who scored 162 goals for the club (from 1962 to 1977). He also holds the club record of 4 hat tricks. The club's second highest scorer is Georgi Iliev, who scored 71 goals. Center forward Miroslav Manolov holds the club's and A Group's record for the fastest goal - 6 seconds after the referee's first signal, against FC Montana on 22 March 2012.

Cherno More's biggest victories in A Group are the 8-0 wins against Cherveno Zname Pavlikeni in 1955 and Maritsa Plovdiv in 1968. Cherno More's largest defeat, 1–8, was against Lokomotiv Plovdiv in 2004. 
Also, the club's win against UE Sant Julia, 5–0, in 2008, was the largest European win in the club's history.

Players

First-team squad 

For recent transfers, see Transfers summer 2022 and Transfers winter 2022–23.

Foreign players 
Up to twenty foreign nationals can be registered and given a squad number for the first team in the Bulgarian First League, however only five non-EU nationals can be used during a match day. Those non-EU nationals with European ancestry can claim citizenship from the nation their ancestors came from. If a player does not have European ancestry he can claim Bulgarian citizenship after playing in Bulgaria for 5 years.

EU Nationals
 Vlatko Drobarov
 Arlind Dakaj

EU Nationals (Dual citizenship)
  Mazire Soula

Non-EU Nationals
 Alex Fernandes
 Matheus Machado
 Michael

UEFA ranking

Source: UEFA Club Coefficients
Last updated: 21 July 2017

Club officials

Board of directors

Current technical body

Coaches history

References

External links 
Official websites
Official website
Cherno More Varna - History and Statistics
UEFA Profile
http://www.uefa.com/search/video/index.html#cherno%20more%20varna
http://www.uefa.com/search/photos/index.html#cherno%20more%20varna
http://www.uefa.com/teamsandplayers/teams/club=75787/domestic/
http://www.uefa.com/memberassociations/association=bul/news/newsid=2252898.html
http://www.uefa.com/uefaeuropaleague/season=2009/clubs/club=75787/matches/index.html
http://www.uefa.com/uefaeuropaleague/season=2010/clubs/club=75787/matches/index.html
http://www.uefa.com/uefaeuropaleague/season=2016/clubs/club=75787/
http://www.uefa.com/memberassociations/news/newsid=63807.html
http://www.uefa.com/uefaeuropaleague/news/newsid=2042576.html
http://www.afc-ajax.info/nl/wedstrijd/1966-6-8-Cherno-More-Ajax
https://web.archive.org/web/20160304185523/http://www.bfunion.bg/news/4394

Supporters websites
Cherno More fansite

 
Football clubs in Bulgaria
Association football clubs established in 1913
1913 establishments in Bulgaria